Mandy Huydts (born April 9, 1969) is a Dutch singer and voice actress.

Singer
At age 9, Huydts began her career at VARA's Kinderen voor Kinderen. In 1986 she and the girl group Frizzle Sizzle took 13th place at the 1986 Eurovision Song Contest with the song Everything has a Rhythm. Afterwards, she formed with Franky Disasters in 1990 the duo "Justian & Mandy" that resulted in the CD Friends for a Lifetime. In 1992, she started as a backing singer for René Froger (The Frogettes) and made her first solo CD in 1994.

Voice actress 
In addition to her work as a singer, she frequently serves as a voice actress animated films like Pokémon, Totally Spies! and Trollz. She is also a member of the Eurostars. They looked after the vocal coaching of the backing vocals during the Toppers in the Arena and sang along during Symphonica in Rosso with Paul de Leeuw. She sang in many concerts and CDs by artists including Gerard Joling and many others.

Voice roles
Totally Spies! as Alex
Trollz as Topaz
What's with Andy? as Teri (Season 2)

References

External links

1969 births
Living people
Dutch women singers
Dutch voice actresses
Eurovision Song Contest entrants of 1986
Eurovision Song Contest entrants for the Netherlands